West Side (also spelled Westside) is an unincorporated community in Lake County, Oregon, located southwest of the county seat of Lakeview.

History
The community was named for the Westside Store, and indirectly for its position on the western side of Goose Lake. The West Side post office was established in June 1923 and closed on July 31, 1942. Will C. Fleming was the first postmaster.

References

Unincorporated communities in Lake County, Oregon
Unincorporated communities in Oregon